All Good Things may refer to:

Music
All Good Things, an American Alternative rock band formed in 2013.

Albums
All Good Things (album), a 2002 album by Sissel
All Good Things: Jerry Garcia Studio Sessions, a box set by Jerry Garcia
All Good Things, an album by Pacha Massive

Songs
"All Good Things (Come to an End)", a 2006 song by Nelly Furtado
"All Good Things", a song by Mandy Moore from Wild Hope (2007)
Also recorded by co-writers The Weepies, from Hideaway (2008)

Theatre
All Good Things, a 2004 stage musical based on the story of the American rock band the Remains

Television and film
All Good Things (film), a 2010 film starring Ryan Gosling and Kirsten Dunst
All Good Things (TV series), a 1991 BBC TV programme
"All Good Things..." (The Hills), the final episode of The Hills
"All Good Things..." (Star Trek: The Next Generation), the final episode of Star Trek: The Next Generation
All Good Things, a 2018 film starring Morgan Fairchild
"All Good Things...", the first part of the two-part final episode of Dawson's Creek